The Triple Nine Society (TNS) is an international high IQ society for adults whose score on a standardized test demonstrates an IQ at or above the 99.9th percentile of the human population. The society recognizes scores from over 20 different tests of adult intelligence. 
The society was founded in 1978 and is a non-profit, 501(c)(7) organization incorporated in Virginia, USA. , it reports a member base of over 1,900 adults in 50 countries.

Organization
Executive Committee Officers serve for two-year terms. Six are elected and three are appointed. In 2015 TNS established a 501(c)(3) subsidiary charitable organization, the Triple Nine Society Foundation, to provide scholarships to intellectually gifted students pursuing higher education goals, to educate the public about the needs of very intellectually gifted people, and for other charitable work.

Communication

TNS publishes a bimonthly journal, Vidya, which contains articles, poetry and other creative content contributed by members conversant with a variety of subjects, as well as Officers' Reports and other official business of the Society. TNS members communicate with one another online through email lists, a Facebook group, two Yahoo! Groups, a LinkedIn group and a scheduled weekly IRC chat; European members have established a group in XING and a French language members-only Yahoo! Group. In the autumn, the society sponsors an annual meeting in the United States called the "ggg999" meeting, with "ggg" referring to "Global General Gathering". A European meeting ("egg999") is arranged in the spring.

Qualifying test scores
To qualify for membership, an applicant must submit a qualifying score earned on any of the standardized tests recognized by the Society; these include IQ tests as well as various college admissions exams and military classification tests.

For IQ tests, a qualifying score corresponds to an IQ of at least 146 for tests with standard deviation of 15 (e.g., WAIS-III/IV/V, Stanford-Binet 5, Raven's APM), at least 149 for tests with a standard deviation of 16 (e.g., Stanford-Binet IV and CTMM), or at least 173 for tests with a standard deviation of 24 (e.g., Cattell III-B).  

The society also accepts applicants based on standardized test scores that have well-established psychometric correlations with IQ, including pre-2005 SAT (1450 or 1520 depending on year taken), pre–November 2001 GRE (1460 or 2180 depending on year taken), LSAT (46, 48, 173 or 730 depending on year taken), ACT (32 or 34 depending on year taken), and the Miller Analogies Test (472 scaled or 85 raw).

Notable members
 Robert Forster (1941–2019), actor in Jackie Brown and Breaking Bad.
 Andrew York (b.1958), American classical guitarist and composer.
 Henry "Hammerin' Hank" Milligan (b.1958), American retired professional boxer.

See also
Mensa, high-IQ society
Intertel, high-IQ society

References

External links
 

High-IQ societies
Organizations established in 1978
1978 establishments in the United States
Non-profit organizations based in Virginia